Vintileasca is a commune located in Vrancea County, Romania. It is composed of six villages: Bahnele, După Măgura, Neculele, Poiana Stoichii, Tănăsari and Vintileasca.

References

Communes in Vrancea County
Localities in Muntenia